Arriva London is a major bus company operating services in Greater London. It is a subsidiary of Arriva UK Bus and operates services under contract to Transport for London. It was formed in 1998 from a fusion of previously separate Arriva subsidiaries Grey-Green, Leaside Buses, Kentish Bus, London & Country and South London Transport. Operations are split between two registered companies, Arriva London North Limited and Arriva London South Limited.

History

The origins of Arriva London can be traced back to 1980 when the Cowie Group purchased the Grey-Green coach business in London. In February 1987, Grey-Green commenced operating bus routes in north and east London under contract to London Regional Transport.

Meanwhile, on 1 April 1989 London Buses was divided into 11 separate business units, two of which were Leaside Buses and South London Transport. As part of the privatisation of London bus services, the Cowie Group purchased these business units in September 1994 and January 1995, rebranding both as Cowie Leaside and Cowie South London in January 1996.

On 1 August 1996, the Cowie Group purchased British Bus, which owned the Kentish Bus and London & Country businesses that also operated London bus services. In November 1997, the Cowie Group was rebranded as Arriva.

Arriva London North
Arriva London North Limited operates five bus garages.

Edmonton (EC)
Edmonton operates routes 158, 259 and N279.

History
The garage was reopened by County Bus & Coach in 1997, and in 1998 this operation was merged with the Leaside Travel unit. In 2005 the garage was adapted for Mercedes-Benz Citaro articulated buses on route 149. Having closed in September 2012, on 1 March 2014, Edmonton reopened to replace Lee Valley.

Enfield (E)
Enfield garage operates routes 121, 191, 192, 279, 307, 313, 349, 377, and W6.

History
Enfield garage was built in 1927 by the London General Omnibus Company. Further land was soon acquired in the front of the garage for use as a bus stand, which later also got used as a terminus for trolleybuses. The garage was modernised at a cost of over £6 million in the early 1980s, and when it reopened in 1984 it had space for 106 buses. More recently it has become a central part of Arriva London operations with the accident repair centre and undertaking of major refurbishments.

Palmers Green (AD)

Palmers Green operates routes 34, 102, 141, 329, 340 and 675.

Opened in July 1912 by the London General Omnibus Company to house their Central London bus fleet operating in competition with the MET trams. Just before World War II the allocation at Palmers Green was entirely AEC Regents, whilst afterwards it was allocated AEC Regent III RT, RTL, RTW and SRTs, making Palmers Green the only London Transport garage to be allocated all four standard double deck types, although none could fit in the garage until the roof could be raised by 10 inches, which was completed in 1952 after a process taking 20 weeks. The garage was further modernised in 1974 by which time 60 buses were allocated. AEC Routemasters arrived in 1969 replacing the RTs, but the RTs lasted there until 1978.

One man operated buses in the form of AEC Regal VIs began arriving and were followed in time by AEC Swifts, Daimler Fleetlines, and MCW Metrobuses. The Routemasters lasted on route 29 until the late 1980s, and in 1994 the allocation was 51, entirely MCW Metrobuses. In latter years the allocation has increased slightly and other than Metrobuses, Volvo B10Ms and Alexander ALX400 bodied DAF DB250LFs have been allocated.

Tottenham (AR)

Tottenham garage operates routes 19, 41, 123, 149, 243, 318, 341, N19 and N41.

History
Tottenham garage was built in 1913 by the MET to run buses to support their tram network. The buses were requisitioned during World War I, and then between 1917 and 1919 the garage was loaned to AEC. Before World War II in 1939 the allocation consisted of ST, STL and LTs, but during the war it was the first garage to receive utility Guy Arabs, and later in 1949 London's first 8 ft wide buses. When route 236 moved with its RFs to Dalston in 1971 it signalled an absence of single deckers at the garage that would last until 2001 when route W4 was won.

MCW Metrobuses and AEC Routemasters were the staple diet of the garage for many years until the new Alexander ALX400 bodied DAF DB250LFs arrived. The final Routemasters left Tottenham in September 2004 when route 73 was converted to Mercedes-Benz Citaro articulated bus operation and moved to Lea Valley. However, Tottenham has retained a single Routemaster for the Arriva London Heritage fleet for use at shows and special events. It is probably the most famous too, being the (numerically) first production Routemaster, RM5.

Wood Green (WN)

Wood Green garage operates routes 29, 144, 221, W3, W4 and night route N29.

History
Transformed in the early 1900s from a horse tram depot to a modern tram depot with a capacity of 67. It was completely remodelled in the late 1930s to allow for trolleybus operations and a capacity of 108. The garage was further adapted again in 1960 for buses. AEC Routemasters arrived to replace trolleybuses in April 1961, and with the closure of West Green in 1962 more work arrived.

Arriva London East

Ash Grove (AE)

Ash Grove bus garage operates routes 78 and 254.

History
One of three new garages opened in 1981 by London Buses at a cost of £3.5 million, it had space for 140 buses undercover and a further 30 in the yard. The roof was unusual in being carried by 10 35-ton triangular trusses, said to be the largest in the UK, supported on reinforced concrete columns. Although technically in Hackney, buses showed "CAMBRIDGE HEATH Ash Grove Garage" on their blinds.

On opening the garage took over Hackney's operation of Red Arrow routes 502 and 513 using brand new Leyland Nationals which had been stored at the garage, and also the entire Hackney and Dalston allocations. Unfortunately, Ash Grove found itself in the London Forest operation, and also had a reputation for staff militancy and closed in 1991. The garage was reopened in 1994 by Kentish Bus to operate their Leyton area route gains, although they referred to it as Cambridge Heath. It was also used over the years to house stored vehicles for the London Transport Museum, and again in 2000 to store additional AEC Routemasters that had been acquired to supplement shortages in London.

In 2000 it was reopened by the London Buses subsidiary East Thames Buses which took over the former Harris Bus routes after that company ran into financial difficulties. Hackney Community Transport also moved into the garage yard in recent times to house its routes won in the London area although East Thames Buses later moved to new premises in Mandela Way, Southwark and were replaced at the garage by Arriva's new Mercedes-Benz Citaro articulated buses for route 38 following the conversion from Routemasters in November 2005.

On 27 April 2013, Arriva London commenced operating route 106. In addition, from May 2014, route 38 was operated with New Routemasters.
On 26 September 2015, route 168 was passed to Metroline.
On 25 February 2017, Arriva London commenced operating route 48.
On 12 October 2019, route 48 was withdrawn.

Barking (DX)

Barking garage operates routes 150, 175, 325 and 368.

History
Barking garage was opened in 1992 by Grey-Green to meet the demands of their expanding North East London operations. Dix Coaches was a subsidiary of Grey-Green operating from a base in the Dagenham area, which moved to the new garage on opening, hence the DX code.
Route 135 was taken over by Docklands Buses on 23 May 2015.

On 30 April 2016, Arriva London took over the operation of route 368 from Blue Triangle.

Clapton (CT)

Clapton garage operates routes 38, 73, 242, 253 and night routes N38, N73, N242 and N253.

Grays (GY)
Grays garage operates routes 66, 103, 248, 347, 370, 375.

History
As part of a decision to consolidate all of Arriva's Transport for London routes with Arriva London, Grays garage was transferred from Arriva Southern Counties on 1 January 2016.

Arriva London South
Arriva London South Limited operates five bus garages.

Brixton (BN)

Brixton garage operates routes 50, 59, 133, 137, 319, 333 and N133.

History
Originally built as a depot for cable trams which ran up Brixton Hill in 1892, it was re-built between 1904 and 1906 for use by electric trams. In 1993 it was extended onto a site formerly owned by the water board and containing a large water main, and then in 1949 reconstruction started to bury the main and convert the depot into one large building instead of two smaller ones. The last trams ran from the depot in 1951, by which time AEC Regent III RTs had started to arrive with the last remaining until 1976.

In 1971 Brixton became one of the first to receive Daimler Fleetlines and then in 1984 MCW Metrobuses. The garage also received the first production Wright Cadet bodied DAF single deckers in 2001. Brixton was also the last depot to operate AEC Routemasters in regular service in London on route 159 until December 2005. Now the garage has only double-decker buses, all the other single-decker buses have been transferred to other garages. From 12 December 2015, route 159 passed to Abellio London with New Routemaster buses, marking Brixton's last night route.

Croydon (TC)

Croydon garage operates routes 60, 166, 194, 264, 312, 405, 412, 466, 612, 627, and 685.

History
Built by the London General Omnibus Company in 1915, the garage was handed over to Thomas Tilling on opening as part of an agreement between the two operators. The garage had to have roof reconstruction in the early 1930s to allow roofed double deckers to use the garage and was totally destroyed in 1941 after an air raid which also killed four staff and destroyed 56 buses. The reconstruction was finally completed in the mid-1950s. AEC Regent III RTs mainly monopolised the garage until the arrival of AEC Routemasters in 1964.

In 1969 experimental XAs and later FRM1 were tested on route 233. When the XAs departed in 1973 they were replaced by Daimler Fleetlines which lasted until January 1993. LSs started to arrive in the late 1970s and MCW Metrobus in 1985 until they were replaced by Leyland Titans. When Elmers End closed a reshuffle took place with the Routemasters departing and the garage became fully one man operated, and later in 1994, the garage became fully double deck with the departure of the last Leyland Nationals.

Dartford (DT)
Dartford Garage operates routes 99, 229, 269, 301, 335, 401, 428, 492, B13 and B15.

History
As part of a decision to consolidate all of Arriva's Transport for London routes with Arriva London, Dartford garage was transferred from Arriva Southern Counties on 1 January 2016.

Norwood (N)
Norwood garage operates routes 2, 137, 157, 202, 249, 417, 450, 468 and night routes N2, and N137.

History
Norwood garage was opened in 1909 by the London General Omnibus Company. The garage has had a steady allocation over the years and in 1951 took over some of the vehicles for the Festival of Britain services from the nearby Norwood Tram Depot. In 1981 the garage underwent complete reconstruction, with the buses and staff being transferred temporarily to the reopened Clapham Garage until 1984.

The allocation has mainly been Leyland Olympians and AEC Routemasters until recently when Alexander ALX400 bodied DAF DB250s were allocated in its completely double-deck allocation which included the Northern Counties Palatine bodied Volvo Olympians which came with the operation of the former Londonlinks routes 176/route 188.

The garage previously supplied some buses and drivers for route 19 following the conversion from Routemaster operation in 2005, but this ceased with the closure of Battersea, with the whole of the route transferring to Brixton.

Thornton Heath (TH)
Thornton Heath garage operates routes 64, 250, 255, 289, 410, 689 and night route N250.

History
Originally opened as the garage for the first horse tramway in Croydon in 1879 it was later rebuilt as an electric tram depot in 1901. Initially, it could house 26 trams but was extended the following year to take 43 cars. Thornton Heath was earmarked for closure as a tram depot for reconstruction at the tram replacement program of 1950–52 but actually shut before the last tram finished with the work and staff moving to Purley.

Buses were starting to operate from the new garage before reconstruction was complete in 1951 with 54 AEC Regent III RTs, just half of its capacity. AEC Routemasters arrived in the early 1960s bringing it up to 84 buses. The RTs lasted until 1976, outlasting the RMs which were replaced by Daimler Fleetlines in 1971, although they did return between 1976–1978 and 1982–1987 when the garage became entirely one man operated.

By 1994 the garage was worked almost entirely by Leyland Olympians and MCW Metrobuses with a few Dennis Dart and MCW Metroriders. There was also a period where the then South London Transport regularly transferred vehicles about, and whilst Thornton Heath retained its Olympians throughout, they were joined not only by Metrobuses but also Leyland Titans. Thornton Heath also briefly flirted with SR-class StarRiders, as well as sharing vehicle evaluation duties with Bromley for the DA/SA classes of vehicle, operating SA1 From October 1989 to February 1990 before swapping it for DA1, which stayed here for a further 6 months before being moved to Westlink.

Former Garages

Battersea (BA)

History
The original Battersea garage was opened in 1906 by the London Roadcar Company on the north side of Hester Road, but by 1914 more space was needed and an annexe was built on the south side. Two modernisation schemes were undertaken, first in the 1960s to allow for AEC Routemasters to be allocated and again in 1971 when a new canteen and recreation room was built.

The garage closed in 1985 with its allocation being split between Victoria and Wandsworth garages. Battersea was however given a reprieve some time later when it was used to house the London Buses coaches and sightseeing operations until 1988 when the entire operation moved to Wandsworth garage. In 1993, a yard adjacent to the old garage was opened as a base for Kentish Bus route 19 operation after it had moved out of its Covent Garden Market base.

Most of the area formally occupied on both the North and South sides of Hester Road has now been built into a luxury flats complex. The only section remaining is the small shed which was originally an outstation from Brixton garage housing the route 19 Routemasters. When the Routemasters left in July 2005 the garage received an allocation of Alexander ALX400 bodied Volvo B7TLs for route 19, although some of these need to be parked at (and use drivers from) Norwood garage because there was not enough space for these larger buses.

In November 2009, Battersea garage was closed and the site redeveloped.

Beddington Farm (CN)

History
A modern purpose built depot that was largely open air. Opened in 1990 by London Country Bus Services, it ran 73 vehicles, although had space for 120. Beddington Farm was to replace the existing garages at Godstone and Chelsham and operated both LB tendered routes and existing London Country Croydon area routes. Beddington Farm became a Londonlinks depot when the Non-London work moved away before coming under Arriva South. It was transferred to Arriva London in 1999 with six routes and buses painted red, green or blue. In 2007 route 450 was transferred to Beddington Garage from Thornton Heath in a swap with route 289.

On 3 March 2012, route 455 passed to Abellio London.

In July 2011 Arriva confirmed Beddington Farm would close by 31 March 2012.

Garston (GR)

As of June 2018, Garston garage operated London routes 288, 303, 305, H18 and H19.

History
Opened on 18 June 1952, Garston became part of London Country North West in 1986, being included in the sale of the business to Luton & District Transport in 1988 which in turn was rebranded Arriva Shires & Essex. In 1986 it became a London Regional Transport contractor when it began to operate route 142. As part of a decision to consolidate all of Arriva's Transport for London routes with Arriva London, Garston garage was transferred from Arriva Shires & Essex on 1 January 2016. It closed on 31 August 2018 coinciding with the expiry of its last Transport for London contracts.

Heathrow (HE)

History
The depot was originally operated by Tellings-Golden Miller. On 31 May 2014, the garage gained route E10 from Metroline. It used new Alexander Dennis Enviro 200 single deckers. As part of a decision to consolidate all of Arriva's Transport for London routes with Arriva London, Heathrow garage was transferred from Tellings-Golden Miller on 1 January 2016.
During December 2017, the operation of route E10 was transferred to London United. As a result, the depot closed soon after.

Lee Valley (LV)

History
The depot is at the back of an industrial estate alongside the River Lea close to Northumberland Park. The depot was opened in 2005 to house the Mercedes-Benz Citaro articulated buses for route 149 which were later joined by more with the conversion of route 73.

On 15 October 2011, route W3 was transferred to this garage.

On 28 January 2012, route 318 was transferred to this garage. On 25 February 2012, route 397 was transferred to this garage. On 3 March 2012, Arriva London commenced operating route W11. On 10 March 2012, route 379 was transferred to this garage. On 24 March 2012, routes 34, 444 and 657 were transferred to this garage.

On 3 September 2012, routes 628, 653, 683 and 688 passed to Sullivan Buses.

On 1 March 2014, Lee Valley garage closed with the site acquired by National Grid with operations transferred to a reopened Edmonton.

Stamford Hill (SF)

History
Stamford Hill opened in February 1907 as a London City Council tram depot. In February 1939, it was converted into trolleybus depot and in July 1961 for bus use. It was closed in 1995, before reopening in 2006. It closed again in November 2020.

Fleet
As at May 2015, the fleet consisted of 1,460 buses. As at March 2021 it numbered 1,590 buses, the second highest of the London Buses operators.

The Heritage Fleet

The Heritage Fleet was operated between 2006 and 2022 by Arriva. It used AEC Routemasters for private hire work, and was formed after Routemasters in London were withdrawn from normal service in December 2005.

History
Arriva London inherited four Routemaster operator services when it purchased Leaside Buses and South London Transport: routes 19, 38, 73 and 159. Routes 19 and 159 were replaced by one man double deckers and 38 and 73 by Mercedes-Benz Citaro articulated buses. Route 159 was the last London route to be converted on 9 December 2005, bringing 50 years of Routemaster operation to a close.

Following this, Arriva London collected some of the more significant Routemasters in their fleet and set up the Heritage Fleet in early 2006.

In November 2022, Arriva London announced it would put all vehicles from the Heritage Fleet up for sale by the end of 2022, ending 17 years of service with the division. Routemaster RM2217 operated special services on route 137 on 2 December to commemorate the end of the Heritage Fleet, with proceeds from the event being donated to the Royal British Legion.

Operations
The Heritage Fleet offered their vehicles for private hire, such as events celebration and weddings. The buses were also hired to attend other public events, and often the buses appeared at bus events, such as Showbus and the London Bus Preservation Trust Cobham bus rally.

Fleet
The Heritage Fleet was made up of nine AEC Routemasters. As Arriva was the biggest operator of Routemasters before they were withdrawn from normal services, they operated some of the most significant Routemasters. These included;

RM5: This is the lowest numbered production Routemaster, although RM8 was actually built first.
RM6: In 2002, this Routemaster was painted in a gold livery to celebrate the Queen's Golden Jubilee, the livery which it now carries.
RML901: This was part of the first batch of 24 RMLs (Routemaster Lengthened) to enter service.
RM1124: This was retained as it contains a Cummins Euro II engine, meaning it already meets emission standards to be set for London.
RMC1453: This was the first production Green Line Routemaster Coach.
RMC1464: This is an open top bus, so is popular for private hires.
RM2217: The last production standard length Routemaster built. This bus operated the final regular Routemaster service in December 2005.
RML2355: This is still in the condition as when it left service, but is awaiting restoration. It is unusual in retaining its original body and chassis after the Routemaster overhaul scheme.
RML2360: This is being looked after for the London Transport Museum. It has been converted inside for exhibition use.

References

External links

Arriva London website

London
London bus operators
Transport companies established in 1998
1998 establishments in England